is a Japanese former football player.

Playing career
Nozawa was born in Kasama on August 12, 1981. He joined J1 League club Kashima Antlers in 1999. On April 10, when he was 17 years old, he debuted against Kyoto Purple Sanga. In early 2000s, he could not play many matches behind Mitsuo Ogasawara, Masashi Motoyama so on. From 2005, he played many matches and he completely became a regular as offensive midfielder after Ogasawara moved to Italy in September 2006. The club also won the champions for 3 years in a row (2007-2009). In 2012, he moved to Vissel Kobe. Although he played as regular player, the club was relegated to J2 League end of 2012 season. In 2013, he returned to Kashima Antlers. Although he played as regular player in early 2013, his opportunity to play decreased from late 2013.

In August 2014, he moved to Vegalta Sendai. He played as regular player until 2015. However his opportunity to play decreased from 2016. In 2018, he moved to Australian club Wollongong Wolves. In 2019, he returned to Japan and joined Regional Leagues club FC Tiamo Hirakata. He retired at the end of the 2020 season.

Club statistics
Updated to 1 January 2020.

Team honors
A3 Champions Cup – 2003
J1 League – 2000, 2001, 2007, 2008, 2009
Emperor's Cup – 2007, 2010
J.League Cup – 2000, 2002, 2011
Japanese Super Cup – 2009, 2010
Suruga Bank Championship – 2013

References

External links

1981 births
Living people
Association football people from Ibaraki Prefecture
Japanese footballers
J1 League players
Kashima Antlers players
Vissel Kobe players
Vegalta Sendai players
Wollongong Wolves FC players
FC Tiamo Hirakata players
Japanese expatriate footballers
Expatriate soccer players in Australia
Japanese expatriate sportspeople in Australia
Footballers at the 2002 Asian Games
Asian Games medalists in football
Asian Games silver medalists for Japan
Association football midfielders
Medalists at the 2002 Asian Games